This is a list of notable individuals and organizations who voiced their endorsement of Kamala Harris's campaign for the Democratic Party's nomination for the 2020 U.S. presidential election before she dropped out of the race on December 3, 2019.

Federal officials

Executive branch officials

Former
 Katherine Archuleta, former Director of the U.S. Office of Personnel Management (2013–2015)
 Tony West, former U.S. Associate Attorney General (2012–2014); Harris's brother-in-law

U.S. Ambassadors

Former
 Ray Mabus, U.S. Ambassador to Saudi Arabia (1994–1996); U.S. Secretary of the Navy (2009–2017); Governor of Mississippi (1988–1992)

U.S. Representatives

Current
 Ruben Gallego, U.S. Representative from AZ-07 since 2015 (previously endorsed Eric Swalwell)
 Barbara Lee, U.S. Representative from CA-13 since 1998
 Jim Costa, U.S. Representative from CA-16 since 2005
 Salud Carbajal, U.S. Representative from CA-24 since 2017 (previously endorsed Beto O'Rourke)
 Julia Brownley, U.S. Representative from CA-26 since 2013
 Ted Lieu, U.S. Representative from CA-33 since 2015
 Nanette Barragán, U.S. Representative from CA-44 since 2017
 Jahana Hayes, U.S. Representative from CT-05 since 2019
 Alcee Hastings, U.S. Representative from FL-20 since 1993 (later endorsed Joe Biden)
 Frederica Wilson, U.S. Representative from FL-24 since 2011 (later endorsed Joe Biden)
 Bobby Rush, U.S. Representative from IL-01 since 1993 (later endorsed Michael Bloomberg)
 Danny Davis, U.S. Representative from IL-07 since 1997(later endorsed Joe Biden)
 Brenda Lawrence, U.S. Representative from MI-14 since 2015
 Lacy Clay, U.S. Representative from MO-01 since 2001
 Marcia Fudge, U.S. Representative from OH-11 since 2008(later endorsed Joe Biden)
 Al Green, U.S. Representative from TX-09 since 2005
 Stacey Plaskett, Delegate to the U.S. House of Representatives from the U.S. Virgin Islands' at-large congressional district since 2015(later endorsed Michael Bloomberg)

Former
 Katie Hill, U.S. Representative from CA-25 (2019)
 Janice Hahn, U.S. Representative from CA-36 (2011–2013) and CA-44 (2013–2016); member of the Los Angeles County Board of Supervisors from District 4 (2016–present)

State officials

Governors

Current
 Gavin Newsom, Governor of California since 2019; former Lieutenant Governor (2011–2019); former Mayor of San Francisco (2004–2011)

State executive officials

Current
 Eleni Kounalakis, Lieutenant Governor of California since 2019; former U.S. Ambassador to Hungary (2010–2013)(later endorsed Pete Buttigieg)
 Ricardo Lara, Insurance Commissioner of California since 2019
 Fiona Ma, State Treasurer of California since 2019 (later endorsed Michael Bloomberg)
 Alex Padilla, Secretary of State of California since 2015 (later endorsed Joe Biden)
 Tony Thurmond, State Superintendent of Public Instruction of California since 2019

Former
 Martha Coakley, Attorney General of Massachusetts (2007–2015); Democratic nominee for U.S. Senate in 2010 and Governor in 2014

State legislators

Current
 Rolanda Hollis, Alabama State Representative from District 58 since 2017
 Mike McGuire, California State Senator from District 2 since 2014
 Bill Dodd, California State Senator from District 3 since 2016 (later endorsed Joe Biden)
 Cathleen Galgiani, California State Senator from District 5 since 2012(later endorsed Joe Biden)
 Richard Pan, California State Senator from District 6 since 2014
 Nancy Skinner, California State Senator from District 9 since 2016
 Bob Wieckowski, California State Senator from District 10 since 2014; California State Assemblyman from District 20 (2010–2012) and from District 25 (2012–2014); Fremont City Councillor from District A (2004–2010)
 Scott Wiener, California State Senator from District 11 since 2016(later endorsed Elizabeth Warren)
 Anna Caballero, California State Senator Dem from District 12 since 2018
 Jerry Hill, California State Senator from District 13 since 2012(later endorsed Joe Biden)
 Jim Beall, California State Senator from District 15 since 2012
 Bill Monning, California State Senator from District 17 since 2012; Majority Leader since 2014
 Robert Hertzberg, California State Senator from District 18 since 2014
 Hannah-Beth Jackson, California State Senator from District 19 since 2012)
 Connie Leyva, California State Senator from District 20 since 2014
 Susan Rubio, California State Senator from District 22 since 2018
 Anthony Portantino, California State Senator from District 25 since 2016(later endorsed Joe Biden)
 Ben Allen, California State Senator from District 26 since 2014; 33rd University of California student regent (2006–2007)
 Holly Mitchell, California State Senator from District 30 since 2013
 Richard Roth, California State Senator from District 31 since 2012 (later endorsed Michael Bloomberg)
 Bob Archuleta, California State Senator from District 32 since 2018(later endorsed Joe Biden)
 Lena Gonzalez, California State Senator from District 33 since 2019
 Steven Bradford, California State Senator from District 35 since 2016
 Toni Atkins, California State Senator from District 39 since 2016; President pro tempore since 2018
 Ben Hueso, California State Senator from District 40 since 2013
 Cecilia Aguiar-Curry, California State Assemblywoman from District 4 since 2016
 Kevin McCarty, California State Assemblyman from District 7 since 2014
 Susan Talamantes Eggman, California State Assemblywoman from District 13 since 2012
 Buffy Wicks, California State Assemblywoman from District 15 since 2018
 David Chiu, California State Assemblyman from District 17 since 2014(later endorsed Elizabeth Warren)
 Rob Bonta, California State Assemblyman from District 18 since 2012
 Phil Ting, California State Assemblyman from District 19 since 2012
 Evan Low, California State Assemblyman from District 28 since 2014 (later endorsed Andrew Yang)
 Mark Stone, California State Assemblyman from District 29 since 2012
 Rudy Salas, California State Assemblyman from District 32 since 2012
 Monique Limón, California State Assemblywoman from District 37 since 2016
 Christy Smith, California State Assemblywoman from District 38 since 2018
 Luz Rivas, California State Assemblywoman from District 39 since 2018
 James Ramos, California State Assemblyman from District 40 since 2018
 Chris Holden, California State Assemblyman from District 41 since 2012 and former Majority Leader (2014–2016)
 Laura Friedman, California State Assemblywoman from District 43 since 2016
 Jacqui Irwin, California State Assemblywoman from District 44 since 2014
 Jesse Gabriel, California State Assemblyman from District 45 since 2018
 Adrin Nazarian, California State Assemblyman from District 46 since 2012
 Ed Chau, California State Assemblyman from District 49 since 2012
 Richard Bloom, California State Assemblyman from District 50 since 2012
 Wendy Carrillo, California State Assemblywoman from District 51 since 2017
 Miguel Santiago, California State Assemblyman from District 53 since 2014
 Sydney Kamlager-Dove, California State Assemblywoman from District 54 since 2018
 Ian Calderon, California State Assemblyman from District 57 since 2012 and Majority Leader since 2016
 Reggie Jones-Sawyer, California State Assemblyman from District 59 since 2012(later endorsed Bernie Sanders)
 Jose Medina, California State Assemblyman from District 61 since 2012
 Autumn Burke, California State Assemblywoman from District 62 since 2014(later endorsed Joe Biden)
 Anthony Rendon, California State Assemblyman from District 63 since 2012 and Speaker since 2016
 Mike Gipson, California State Assemblyman from District 64 since 2014(later endorsed Joe Biden)
 Al Muratsuchi, California State Assemblyman from District 66 since 2016(later endorsed Joe Biden)
 Tasha Boerner Horvath, California State Assemblywoman from District 76 since 2018
 Todd Gloria, California State Assemblyman from District 78 since 2016
 Serena Gonzales-Gutierrez, Colorado State Representative from District 4 since 2019
 Leslie Herod, Colorado State Representative from District 8 since 2017
 Bobby Gibson, Connecticut State Representative from District 15 since 2018
 Quentin Phipps, Connecticut State Representative from District 100 since 2019
 Anne Meiman Hughes, Connecticut State Representative from District 135 since 2019
 Valencia Seay, Georgia State Senator from District 34 since 2010
 Erick Allen, Georgia State Representative from District 40 since 2019
 Mable Thomas, Georgia State Representative from District 56 since 2013
 Mike Wilensky, Georgia State Representative from District 79 since 2013
 Donna McLeod, Georgia State Representative from District 105 since 2019
 Bob Trammell, Georgia State Representative from District 132 since 2015; Minority Leader since 2017
 Mattie Hunter, Illinois State Senator from District 3 since 2003
 Ram Villivalam, Illinois State Senator from District 8 since 2019
 Laura Fine, Illinois State Senator from District 9 since 2019; former Illinois State Representative from District 17 (2013–2019)
 Kam Buckner, Illinois State Representative from District 26 since 2019
 Deb Conroy, Illinois State Representative from District 46 since 2013
 Bob Morgan, Illinois State Representative from District 58 since 2019
 Ross Wilburn, Iowa State House Representative from District 46 since 2019 (later endorsed Amy Klobuchar)
 Phyllis Thede, Iowa State House Representative from District 93 since 2009(later endorsed Pete Buttigieg)
 Edward James, Louisiana State Representative from District 101 since 2012
 Richard Ames, New Hampshire State Representative from Cheshire District 9 since 2012
 Patricia Cornell, New Hampshire State Representative from Hillsborough District 18 since 2014 (later endorsed Joe Biden)
 Joelle Martin, New Hampshire State Representative from Hillsborough District 23 since 2016
 Jane Beaulieu, New Hampshire State Representative from Hillsborough District 45 since 2012
 Linda Tanner, New Hampshire State Representative from Sullivan District 9 since 2016; Assistant Majority Floor Leader since 2018
 Kevin Parker, New York State Senator from District 21 since 2003
 Brian Benjamin, New York State Senator from District 30 since 2017
 Pat Spearman, Nevada State Senator from District 1 since 2012
 Joyce Woodhouse, Nevada State Senator for Clark County 5 (Dual-member District) District 5 (2006–2010) and District 5 since 2010 (later endorsed Elizabeth Warren)
 Melanie Scheible, Nevada State Senator from District 9 since 2018
 Sandra Jauregui, Nevada State Assemblywoman from District 41 since 2016 (later endorsed Pete Buttigieg)
 Derwin Montgomery, North Carolina State Representative from District 72 since 2018
 John L. Scott Jr., South Carolina State Senator from District 19 since 2009 (later endorsed Tom Steyer)
 Darrell Jackson, South Carolina State Senator from District 21 since 1992(later endorsed Joe Biden)
 J.A. Moore, South Carolina State Representative for District 15 since 2018
 Rosalyn Henderson Myers, South Carolina State Representative for District 31 since 2017
 Patricia Henegan, South Carolina State Representative for District 54 since 2014
 Scott Surovell, Virginia State Senator from District 36 since 2016; former Virginia State Delegate from District 44 (2010–2016)
 Charniele Herring, Majority Leader of the Virginia House of Delegates since 2020, Virginia State Delegate from District 46 since 2009(later endorsed Joe Biden)
 Lashrecse Aird, Virginia State Delegate from District 63 since 2016

Former
 Kevin de León, President pro tempore of the California State Senate (2014–2018), California State Senator for District 24 (2010–2014); California State Assemblyman for District 45 (2006–2010)
 Herb Wesson, Speaker of the California State Assembly (2002–2004) and California State Assemblyman for District 47 (1998–2004); President of the Los Angeles City Council (2011–2020; retained this role throughout Harris' campaign); member of the Los Angeles City Council from District 10 since 2005
 John Pérez, Speaker of the California State Assembly (2010–2014), and California State Assemblyman for District 53 (2008–2014)
 Patricia Harper, Iowa State Senator for District 13 (1997–2002); Iowa State Representative for District 72 (1987–1997)
 Dick Dearden, Iowa State Senator for District 16 (1995–2017)
 Robert Dvorsky, Iowa State Senator for District 37 (2003–2019) and from District 25 (1995–2003); Iowa State Representative from District 49 (1993–1995) and for District 54 (1987–1993)(later endorsed Elizabeth Warren)
 Raj Goyle, Kansas State Representative for District 87 (2007–2011), candidate for Kansas's 4th congressional district (2010)
 Helen Foley, Nevada State Senator (1982–1986) and Nevada State Assemblywoman (1980–1982) (later endorsed Joe Biden)
 Justin Jones, Nevada State Senator for District 9 (2012–2014); Clark County Commissioner from District F since 2019
 Gene Collins, Nevada State Assemblyman from District (1982–1986)
 Wendell Williams, Nevada State Assemblyman from District 6 (1987–2001)
 Lisa DiMartino, New Hampshire State Representative for Belknap District 2 (2012–2014)
 Linda Coleman, North Carolina State Representative for District 38 (2005–2009)
 Brenda Lee Pryce, South Carolina State Representative from District 31 (1995–2005)
 I. S. Leevy Johnson, South Carolina State Representative from District 74 (1970–1980)
 Bakari Sellers, South Carolina State Representative from District 90 (2006–2014)
 Rodney Ellis, Texas State Senator for District 13 (1990–2017); Harris County Commissioner from Precinct 1 since 2017
 Kristine Reeves, Washington State Representative for District 30 (2017–2019)

Local and municipal officials

Mayors

Current
 Randall Woodfin, Mayor of Birmingham, Alabama since 2017(later endorsed Joe Biden)
 Frank Scott Jr., Mayor of Little Rock, Arkansas since 2019 (later endorsed Michael Bloomberg)
 Aja Brown, Mayor of Compton, California since 2013 (later endorsed Michael Bloomberg)
 Robert Garcia, Mayor of Long Beach, California since 2014 (later endorsed Joe Biden)
 Libby Schaaf, Mayor of Oakland, California since 2015
 Darrell Steinberg, Mayor of Sacramento, California, since 2016 (later endorsed Joe Biden)
 London Breed, Mayor of San Francisco, California since 2018; former acting Mayor (2017–2018) (later endorsed Michael Bloomberg)
 Sam Liccardo, Mayor of San Jose, California since 2015 (later endorsed Michael Bloomberg)
 Toni Harp, Mayor of New Haven, Connecticut, since 2014 (later endorsed Michael Bloomberg)
 Justin Wilson, Mayor of Alexandria, Virginia since 2019

Former 
 Michael B. Coleman, Mayor of Columbus, Ohio (2000–2016)(later endorsed Michael Bloomberg)

Local executive officials

Current
 Anna M. Valencia, City Clerk of Chicago since 2017
 Dennis Herrera, City Attorney of San Francisco since 2001
 José Cisneros, Treasurer of San Francisco since 2004
 Karl Racine, Attorney General of Washington, D.C. since 2015

Local legislators

Current
 Andrea Campbell, President of the Boston City Council since 2018; member of the Boston City Council from District 4 (2016–2018)
 David Ryu, Member of the Los Angeles City Council from District 4 since 2015
 Marqueece Harris-Dawson, Member of the Los Angeles City Council from District 8 since 2015
 Curren Price, Member of the Los Angeles City Council from District 9 since 2013
 Lynette Gibson McElhaney, Member of the Oakland City Council from District 3 since 2012
 Helena Moreno, President of the New Orleans City Council (2019–present); Member of the New Orleans City Council since 2018
 Catherine Stefani, Member of the San Francisco Board of Supervisors from District 2 since 2018
 Matt Haney, Member of the San Francisco Board of Supervisors from District 6 since 2019
 Shamann Walton, Member of the San Francisco Board of Supervisors from District 10 since 2019
 Ahsha Safaí, Member of the San Francisco Board of Supervisors from District 11 since 2017
 Malia Cohen, Member of the California Board of Equalization since 2019; President of the San Francisco Board of Supervisors (2018–2019); Member of the San Francisco Board of Supervisors from District 10 (2011–2019)

Former
 Jan Perry, Member of the Los Angeles City Council from District 9 (2001–2013)
 Vallie Brown, Member of the San Francisco Board of Supervisors from District 5 (2018–2019)

Municipal legislators

Current
 Lateefah Simon, Member of Bay Area Rapid Transit Board from District 7 since 2016 and President of the Board since 2020 (after Harris' campaign had ended); President of the Akonadi Foundation since 2016
 Bevan Dufty, Member of the Bay Area Rapid Transit Board for the 9th District since 2016; Member of the San Francisco Board of Supervisors from District 8 (2002–2011);

Notable individuals

Activists
 Deidre DeJear, 2018 Democratic nominee for Secretary of State of Iowa
 Dolores Huerta, labor leader and civil rights activist; co-founder of United Farm Workers

Business leaders
 Susie Tompkins Buell, entrepreneur and businesswoman
 Ari Emanuel, co-CEO of William Morris Endeavor
 Ellen Goldsmith-Vein, producer, founder and CEO of Gotham Group
 Donna Langley, CEO of Universal Pictures
 Ronald Meyer, Vice Chairman of NBCUniversal
 Hylda Queally, talent agent
 Shonda Rhimes, producer
 Jeff Zucker, President and CEO of CNN and former CEO of NBCUniversal

Celebrities
 J. J. Abrams, writer and filmmaker (later endorsed Joe Biden)
 Ben Affleck, actor (later endorsed Joe Biden)
 Anthony Anderson, actor, comedian, writer
 Azealia Banks, rapper, singer, songwriter, record producer and actress
 Elizabeth Banks, actress
 Lance Bass, singer, dancer, actor, film and television producer, and author (later endorsed Joe Biden)
 Melissa Benoist, actress and singer
 Scooter Braun, music manager
 Luther Campbell, leader of 2 Live Crew, rapper, record executive
 Don Cheadle, actor and activist (later endorsed Joe Biden)
 Jon Cryer, actor (later endorsed Joe Biden)
 Leonardo DiCaprio, actor (later endorsed Joe Biden)
 Jesse Tyler Ferguson, actor (later endorsed Joe Biden)
 Jennifer Garner, actress (later endorsed Joe Biden)
 Jon Hamm, actor
 Felicity Huffman, actress
 Mindy Kaling, comedian, actress, author (later endorsed Joe Biden)
 Spike Lee, director, filmmaker (later endorsed Joe Biden)
 Damon Lindelof, screenwriter, writer, producer
 Eva Longoria, actress (later endorsed Joe Biden)
 Ryan Murphy, screenwriter, director, and producer (co-endorsement with Pete Buttigieg, later endorsed Joe Biden)
 Leslie Odom Jr., actor and singer (later endorsed Joe Biden)
 Sean Penn, actor
 Ron Perlman, actor and voice actor (later endorsed Joe Biden)
 Busy Philipps, actress
 Sheryl Lee Ralph, actress, singer, and author
 Andy Richter, actor, writer, comedian
 Emma Roberts, actress and activist
 Steven Spielberg, filmmaker, studio executive, co-founder of Amblin Entertainment (later endorsed Joe Biden)
 Cecily Strong, actress
 Estelle Swaray, singer, songwriter, rapper, record producer and actress
 Charlamagne tha God, radio presenter, television personality, co-host of The Breakfast Club
 Al B. Sure!, singer, songwriter, record producer, radio host and former record executive
 Lily Tomlin, actress (later endorsed Joe Biden)
 Rita Wilson, actress, singer, and producer (later endorsed Joe Biden)
 Reese Witherspoon, actress (later endorsed Joe Biden)

Individuals
 Benjamin Crump, civil rights lawyer (later endorsed Joe Biden)
 Marc Elias, Democratic voting rights lawyer, general counsel for Kamala Harris 2020 presidential campaign
 Maya Harris, lawyer, public policy advocate, and television commentator; Harris's sister (later endorsed Joe Biden)
 Jim Margolis, political consultant, partner at GMMB, Inc.
 Bob Mulholland, senior adviser and chief spokesman of the California Democratic Party (later endorsed Joe Biden)
 Averell Smith, political adviser
 Jon Ossoff, Candidate for U.S Senate in Georgia (later endorsed Joe Biden)

Party officials

Current
 Laphonza Butler, DNC member
 Victor Dutchuk, Chairman of the West Des Moines County, Iowa Democratic Party (later endorsed Amy Klobuchar)
 Coralin Glerum, Chairman of the North Tahoe Nevada Democratic Party
 Jean Hessburg, Chairwoman of the Iowa Democratic Party's Women's Caucus; former Executive Director of the Iowa Democratic Party (later endorsed Amy Klobuchar)
 Larry Hodgen, Cedar County, Iowa Democratic Party Chair (later endorsed Amy Klobuchar)
 Vanessa Phelan, Chairwoman of the Northwest Des Moines County, Iowa Democratic Party (later endorsed Elizabeth Warren)
 Penny Rosfjord, former Chair of the Woodbury County, Iowa Democratic Party (2013–2017) and member of the Iowa Democratic Party State Central Committee since 2017 (later endorsed Amy Klobuchar)
 Emmy Ruiz, DNC member
 Melissa Watson, Berkeley County, South Carolina Democratic Party Chair (later endorsed Joe Biden)

Former
 Susan Dvorsky, Chair of the Iowa Democratic Party (2010–2012)(later endorsed Elizabeth Warren)
 Joe Keefe, Chair of the New Hampshire Democratic Party (1994–1996) (later endorsed Joe Biden)
 Rosa Mendoza, former head of the Democratic Congressional Campaign Committee
 Chris Miller, Chairman of the Clark County, Nevada Democratic Party
 Larry Peterson, Chair of the Crawford County, Iowa Democratic Party

Organizations

Labor unions
 United Farm Workers, representing 10,000

Political organizations
 Michigan Democratic Party Black Caucus

References

External links
 * Official website – Biden-Harris campaign

Kamala Harris
Harris, Kamala
Harris, Kamala